The Äschhorn is a mountain of the Pennine Alps, located north of Zermatt in Valais. The main summit (Ober Äschhorn) has an elevation of 3,669 metres while the lower summit (Unter Äschhorn) has an elevation of 3,618 metres. The Äschhorn is separated from the Zinalrothorn by the Ober Äschjoch (3,622 m).

References

External links
 Äschhorn on Hikr

Mountains of the Alps
Alpine three-thousanders
Mountains of Valais
Mountains of Switzerland